Bassetlaw District Council elections are held every four years. Prior to 2015, elections were generally held three years out of every four, with a third of the council being elected each time. Bassetlaw District Council is the local authority for the non-metropolitan district of Bassetlaw in Nottinghamshire, England. Since the last boundary changes in 2002, 48 councillors have been elected from 25 wards.

Political control
The first election to the council was held in 1973, initially operating as a shadow authority before coming into its powers on 1 April 1974. Since 1973 political control of the council has been held by the following parties:

Leadership
The leaders of the council have been:

Council elections

District result maps

Changes between elections

By-elections

References

By-election results

External links
Bassetlaw District Council

 
Bassetlaw District
Council elections in Nottinghamshire
District council elections in England